Dark Princess is a Russian gothic-metal band from Moscow and Mangazeya that was formed in 2004. The band has received several awards in Russia and has been successful in the Russian music charts.

History
The band was founded by singer Olga "Dark Princess" Romanova.

Its debut album Without You was released in 2005. The songs on this album were written by Mikhail Karasyov and Mikhail Guzz from the band Forgive-Me-Not. Also in 2005, the band released a demo, Stop My Heart, which also included songs from Without You.

In 2006, Dark Princess released a full-length album titled Stop My Heart. A 2008 review by the German Sonic Seducer magazine noted similarities to bands like Evanescence but also original creativity, and praised Olga Romanova's singing as "remarkably competent".

In 2007, the band released its third album, The Brutal Game. Since 2008, the albums have also been distributed in Central and Western Europe.

In 2008, a double CD was included in the heavy-metal magazine EMP that consisted of the band's first two albums, Without You and Stop My Heart. In the same year, the band participated in the preliminary round of the Eurovision Song Contest.

In February 2008, Romanova, citing personal and organizational problems, left the band and was replaced by Natalia Terekhova.

In April 2012, the band released a new album, The World I've Lost. After the release of this album, longtime drummer Denis Stekanov (also known as Ghost) left the band for unknown reasons.

In 2014, the band Dark Princess broke up.

In 2020, Olga Trifonova (ex-Romanova) regained the Dark Princess brand and in the summer of 2020, she began working on the new album "Phoenix," which is planned to be completed by February, 2021. This is a symbolic date for Dark Princess. The number of songs in the album is also not an accident: there will be 13 (11 songs in English and 2 bonus tracks in Russian) – one song for each year when Olga was deprived of the opportunity to create under her creative pseudonym Dark Princess.

Band members

Current members
 Olga Trifonova lead vocals (2004–2008, 2020–present)
 Stepan Zujev keyboards, backing vocals (2005–2014, 2020–present)
 Sergey Moroz drums (2020–present)
 Denis Nikulshin bass guitar (2020–present)
 Andrey Lavrov guitar (2020–present)
 Maxim Demidov guitar (2020–present)

Past members
 Ilya Klokov lead guitar (2004–2014)
 Aleksandr Lubimov rhythm guitar, backing vocals (2004–2014)
 Stanislav Fatyanov bass guitar (2004–2014)
 Denis Stekanov drums (2004–2012)
 Natalia Terekhova lead vocals (2008–2014)
 Kirill Fyodorov drums (2012–2014)

Discography 
 Without You (2005)
 Stop My Heart (2006) – Metal Hammer: 5/7
 Zhestokaya Igra (Жестокая игра; English: The Rude Game) (2007)
 The World I've Lost (2012) – Rock Hard: 7.5/10
 Phoenix (2023)

See also

 List of gothic-metal bands
 Music of Russia

References

External links
  (in Russian), the band's official website
 
 Staff (undated).  "Olga Romanova" (in Russian).  Retrieved 17 January 2013.
 Database (undated).  "Dark Princess".  last.fm.  Retrieved 17 January 2013.

2004 establishments in Russia
Gothic metal musical groups
Musical groups from Moscow
Musical groups established in 2004
Russian heavy metal musical groups
Russian gothic rock groups